Scientia Pharmaceutica is a peer-reviewed open access scientific journal publishing original research papers, short communications and a limited number of reviews on all fields of pharmaceutical sciences and related areas, as well as on pharmaceutical practice. Since 2008 all articles are published open access.

Abstracting and Indexing 
The journal is indexed in Web of Science Emerging Sources Citation Index, Scopus, EMBASE, and other indexing services.

References

External links 
 

Open access journals
Pharmacology journals
Publications established in 1930
Creative Commons Attribution-licensed journals
Quarterly journals
Multilingual journals
MDPI academic journals